Richard Nelson Mason (26 June 1876 – 22 November 1940) was a prominent American educator and businessperson in Washington, D.C. Mason was a great-great-grandson of Founding Father of the United States George Mason and his wife Ann Eilbeck.

Early life
Richard Nelson Mason was born in Culpeper, Virginia on 26 June 1876. Mason was the only son of Beverley Randolph Mason and his wife Elizabeth Harrison Nelson. Mason was named after his grandfather, Dr. Richard Chichester Mason.

Mason's parents began a school for the education of himself, his sisters, and his parents' friends' children. Mason and his siblings were first raised an educated at a residence at 3017 O Street, N.W. in Georgetown. Mason's parents named the school Gunston Hall school for Mason's great-great-grandfather George Mason. As Gunston Hall School grew, it became an institution of higher learning for girls and young ladies.

Marriage and children
Mason married Blanche Andrews on 31 October 1925. He and Blanche had one daughter:

Elizabeth Nelson Mason Nial (born 27 November 1935)
∞ Thomas Lewis Nial (1955)

Education career

Mason was an educator at and later become the business manager of the Gunston Hall School after it moved to its final location at 1906 Florida Avenue, N.W. near 19th and T Streets. Mason's management maintained the school's tradition and continued its high ranking among private schools for young ladies in the United States.

Later life
Mason was elected into the Sons of the American Revolution on 27 May 1915, due to his descent from his great-grandfather, Robert Randolph (1759–1825). Randolph served as an ensign (1775), lieutenant (14 June 1777), and captain in Baylor's Dragoons, Virginia Troops, and aide-de-camp to General Anthony Wayne. Following the American Revolutionary War, Randolph became a member of the Virginia House of Delegates.

Mason continued his role as business manager of the Gunston Hall School until his death. Mason died on 22 November 1940 at Garfield Hospital in Washington, D.C. He was interred on 25 November 1940 at Ivy Hill Cemetery in Alexandria, Virginia.

During World War II, Gunston Hall School closed and was re-opened on Mason Neck, Virginia by Mason's four sisters in 1962.

Ancestry

References

1876 births
1940 deaths
American educators
American Episcopalians
American people of English descent
American school administrators
Burials at Ivy Hill Cemetery (Alexandria, Virginia)
Businesspeople from Virginia
Businesspeople from Washington, D.C.
Mason family
People from Culpeper, Virginia
Sons of the American Revolution
Washington, D.C., Democrats
People from Dupont Circle